Quake is a 2003 album by cellist Erik Friedlander which was released on the Cryptogramophone label featuring the quartet that previously appeared on Topaz .

Reception

The Allmusic review by Thom Jurek awarded the album 4½ stars stating "Ultimately, Quake is a newer and finer example than anything before of Friedlander's unified vision of not only jazz but also the engagement of the dynamic and harmonic within an ensemble to create something that is compelling, beautiful, and unusual even in the outsider downtown tradition".

Writing for All About Jazz, Elliot Simon commented "Quake is further indication that Topaz, led by Friedlander's cello and world view, continues to break ground with its particular brand of synchronic global stew".

Andrew Lindemann Malone stated in JazzTimes that "Erik Friedlander, however, has shown throughout his career that the personality of a cello is determined more than anything else by the personality of its cellist, and his new album as a leader, Quake, proves that even when surrounded by strong, imaginative personalities, his cello is anything but reticent".

Track listing
All compositions by Erik Friedlander
 "Consternation" - 4:25
 "After Hours" - 4:07
 "Bedlam" - 6:13
 "Gol Gham" - 3:35
 "Wire" - 5:49
 "Beauty Beauty" - 11:15
 "Quake" - 3:32
 "Sainted" - 3:49
 "Glass Bell" - 5:31
 "Biscuits" - 5:47
 "Aap Ki" - 2:48
 "Fig" - 5:16

Personnel
Erik Friedlander – cello
Andy Laster - alto saxophone
Stomu Takeishi - bass
Satoshi Takeishi - percussion

References 

2003 albums
Erik Friedlander albums
Cryptogramophone Records albums